We Shall See is a 1964 British drama film directed by Quentin Lawrence and starring Maurice Kaufmann, Faith Brook and Alec Mango. It was adapted from a 1926 novel We Shall See! by Edgar Wallace, and was made at Merton Park Studios as part of the long-running series of Edgar Wallace Mysteries.

Plot
Alva (Faith Brook), the mentally unbalanced wife of airline pilot Evan Collins (Maurice Kaufmann), wants her husband to leave his job. However, she is tragically killed when someone throws a hive of bees into her bedroom. Police deduce that whoever was responsible knew that Alva was allergic to the insects. Each member of the household, both relatives and staff, comes under suspicion, as her psychotic behaviour has both alienated and given everyone a personal interest in her demise.

Partial cast
 Maurice Kaufmann - Evan Collins
 Faith Brook - Alva Collins
 Alec Mango - Ludo
 Alex Macintosh - Greg Thomas
 Hugh Paddick - Connell
 Talitha Pol - Jirina
 Bridget Armstrong - Nurse Rosemary Layton
 William Abney - Shaw
 Donald Morley - Superintendent
 Marianne Stone - Jenny
 David Dodimead - Surgeon

Critical reception
TV Guide wrote, "Predating The Deadly Bees by three years, We Shall See is theoretically the first "killer bee" movie," but the reviewer concluded, "The rest of the picture...is standard crime fare"; and SKY Movies observed, "A well-acted Edgar Wallace thriller about a woman who antagonises everyone she meets. She is also very scared of bees... This difficult central character is strongly acted by Faith Brook. The daughter of Clive Brook, a superstar of both British and Hollywood films in the Twenties and Thirties...(the director) manages an extremely effective climax - with the help of a few hundred bees and the special effects men."

References

External links

1964 films
British drama films
British mystery films
Edgar Wallace Mysteries
Films directed by Quentin Lawrence
British black-and-white films
1960s English-language films
1960s British films